Arne Tode (born 30 June 1985) is a German motorcycle racer who has competed in the Moto2 World Championship, the Supersport World Championship and the FIM Superstock 1000 Cup. He won the IDM Supersport Championship in 2006 and 2008.

Career statistics

Supersport World Championship

Races by year
(key)

Grand Prix motorcycle racing

By season

Races by year
(key)

References

External links

1985 births
Living people
German motorcycle racers
Moto2 World Championship riders
Supersport World Championship riders
FIM Superstock 1000 Cup riders
People from Bergen auf Rügen
Sportspeople from Mecklenburg-Western Pomerania